Jeremy Roy may refer to:

Jérémy Roy (cyclist) (born 1983), French road bicycle racer 
Jérémy Roy (ice hockey) (born 1997), Canadian ice hockey defenceman